Timothy Sylvester Harris (born 6 December 1964) is a Saint Kittitian and Nevisian politician, who served as the third prime minister of Saint Kitts and Nevis from 2015 to 2022. He previously served as Minister of Foreign Affairs from 10 August 2001 to 25 January 2008, as Minister of Finance from 2008 to 2010, and as Senior Minister and Minister for Agriculture from 2010 to 2013.

Life and career
Harris was born, in 1964, and grew up in the rural village of Tabernacle, Saint Kitts. He attended the Cayon High School and Basseterre High School before going to six university campuses, two in the Caribbean and four in Canada. In 1988, Harris graduated from the University of the West Indies at Cave Hill with a B.Sc. degree with a First Class Honours in Accounting, the only graduate of the B.Sc. Accounting programme to obtain this distinction. He also received the Victor Crooke Prize for Best Accounting Student. He returned home and worked for two years at managerial level with S. L. Horsfords and Co Ltd.

In 1990–92 he pursued his M.Sc. degree in accounting at the University of the West Indies at St. Augustine in Trinidad and Tobago. He graduated top of the class with an M.Sc. degree with a Distinction.

In 2001 Harris successfully defended his Ph.D. dissertation at Concordia University in Montreal, Canada. The doctoral programme is a joint Ph.D. programme involving Concordia University, McGill and two francophone universities: H.E.C. (affiliated to Université de Montréal) and UQAM. Harris holds a Doctor of Philosophy degree in administration majoring in accounting.

Harris participated in elective politics in 1993 and was elected as a Member of Parliament on the St. Kitts-Nevis Labour Party ticket in parliamentary elections held in 1995, 2000, 2004, and 2010. He held various cabinet posts, including Minister of Agriculture, Lands and Housing, Minister of Education, Labour and Social Security, Minister of Foreign Affairs and Education and Minister of Foreign Affairs, International Trade, Industry and Commerce. He has published several works and received several awards, including the St. Kitts Youth Council Award for Excellence in Education, the FESTAB Community Award for outstanding contribution to FESTAB and a certificate for outstanding contribution to the Cayon High School.

In 2013 Prime Minister Denzil Douglas fired Harris from the cabinet. Harris established the People's Labour Party (PLP) later in the year. In the buildup to the 2015 general elections the PLP formed the Team Unity alliance with the People's Action Movement and the Concerned Citizens' Movement. The alliance won the elections, and although the PLP won only one seat, Harris became the third Prime Minister of independent St. Kitts and Nevis on 16 February. He succeeded the incumbent, Denzil Douglas, who served a historic near 20-year tenure.

Honors
 :
 Special Grand Cordon of the Order of Propitious Clouds (2019)

References

External links
 
 
 St. Kitts & Nevis - Government of St. Kitts and Nevis official website
 United Nations - Permanent Mission of St. Kitts and Nevis to the United Nations Statement by His Excellency Dr. Timothy Harris

|-

|-

1964 births
Living people
People from Saint John Capisterre Parish
Recipients of the Order of Propitious Clouds
Saint Kitts and Nevis Labour Party politicians
People's Labour Party politicians
University of the West Indies alumni
Prime Ministers of Saint Kitts and Nevis
Foreign Ministers of Saint Kitts and Nevis
Agriculture ministers of Saint Kitts and Nevis
Education ministers of Saint Kitts and Nevis
Finance ministers of Saint Kitts and Nevis
Housing ministers of Saint Kitts and Nevis
Industry ministers of Saint Kitts and Nevis
Labour ministers of Saint Kitts and Nevis
Trade ministers of Saint Kitts and Nevis